The John N. Griffin House is a historic residence located in Astoria, Oregon, United States.

The house was listed on the National Register of Historic Places in 1984.

See also
National Register of Historic Places listings in Clatsop County, Oregon

References

External links

1892 establishments in Oregon
Individually listed contributing properties to historic districts on the National Register in Oregon
Houses completed in 1892
Houses on the National Register of Historic Places in Astoria, Oregon
Stick-Eastlake architecture in Oregon